WIRQ (90.9 FM) is a non-profit radio station broadcasting an alternative format. The station is licensed to Rochester, New York, United States, and is owned by the West Irondequoit Central School District.

WIRQ began broadcasting on January 7, 1960. Originally at 90.9 MHz, the station moved to 93.3 MHz in 1981, then in the early 1990s moved to 94.3 MHz for several years before moving again to 104.7 MHz. In mid-February 2011 the station moved frequency yet again, back to its original 90.9 MHz.

March 1983 marked the beginnings of the station's alternative format. Before then, the station had been mostly block-programmed.

Broadcasting times
WIRQ broadcasts their alternative format during school hours following the Irondequoit High School Morning Show (8:15am to 3:00pm, Monday to Friday).  After 3:00pm, the station plays music on an automated program which also runs on the weekends and during school breaks, giving WIRQ listeners 365 days of listening pleasure.

Station leadership
WIRQ is overseen by the student executive board under the guidance of faculty advisor, Mr. Richard Jones.
The 2019–2020 executive board members are:
 Station manager: Lily LiPera
 Co-station manager: Rory Vancheri
 Music director: Sophia Larson
 Business director:  Annabelle

Specialty shows
Prior to December 2011, WIRQ DJs hosted specialty shows from 4:00pm to 6:00pm, but those have now been moved to the regular broadcasting hours between 8:00am and 3:00pm.  These shows play music from a certain genre or time period, and each DJ has the opportunity to do one specialty show a week in addition to their regularly scheduled radio show.

References

External links

 
About WIRQ

IRQ
High school radio stations in the United States
Alternative rock radio stations in the United States
Radio stations established in 1960
1960 establishments in New York (state)